Holliwell Bridge is a wooden covered bridge in Madison County, Iowa. It was built over the Middle River in 1880 by Benton Jones.

The bridge is no longer in use, but was renovated and restored in 1995 at a cost of $225,000 ($ today). It is featured in the film The Bridges of Madison County. The Holliwell Bridge was added to the National Register of Historic Places in 1976.

Photo gallery

See also
List of bridges documented by the Historic American Engineering Record in Iowa
List of covered bridges in Madison County, Iowa

References

External links

Bridges completed in 1880
Wooden bridges in Iowa
Historic American Engineering Record in Iowa
Covered bridges on the National Register of Historic Places in Iowa
Bridges in Madison County, Iowa
Tourist attractions in Madison County, Iowa
Road bridges in Iowa
National Register of Historic Places in Madison County, Iowa